{{DISPLAYTITLE:C18H18N6O5S2}}
The molecular formula C18H18N6O5S2 (molar mass: 462.505 g/mol) may refer to:

 Cefamandole
 Cefatrizine

Molecular formulas